Patricia Maldonado (born June 12, 1956, in São Paulo, Brazil) is an Argentine-Brazilian writer, who wrote scripts for Argentine television series such as Chiquititas, Verano del '98, Rebelde Way and Floricienta.

Filmography

Writer

Television
 Chiquititas (1995–2001)
 Verano del '98 (1998–2001)
 Luna salvaje (2001)
 Chiquititas, la Historia (2001)
 Rebelde Way (2002–2003)
 Floricienta (2004)
 La Ley del silencio (2005)
 Floribella (2005)
 Champs 12 (2009)
 Dance! La Fuerza del Corazón (2011)

Film
 Chiquititas: Rincón de luz (2001)

Miscellaneous Crew
 De eso no se habla (1993) – secretary
 Rincón de Luz'' (2003) – literary coordinator

External links 
 

1956 births
Argentine businesspeople
Argentine women writers
Brazilian businesspeople
Brazilian emigrants to Argentina
Brazilian women screenwriters
Brazilian screenwriters
Living people
Businesspeople from São Paulo